Imaginary Mary is an American live-action/animated fantasy sitcom television series created by Adam F. Goldberg, David Guarascio and Patrick Osborne that aired on ABC from March 29 to May 30, 2017. The series is executive produced by the creators and was greenlighted to series order on May 12, 2016. A first-look-trailer was released on the same day. ABC reduced the number of episodes from thirteen to nine on September 28, 2016.

On May 11, 2017, the series was cancelled after one season.

Plot
The series follows Alice when an imaginary puppet being from her childhood, named Mary, reappears when she is now a single public relations executive falling in love with a single father of three children. Mary hopes to guide (or misguide) her.

Cast
 Jenna Elfman as Alice
 Stephen Schneider as Ben Cooper, Alice’s love interest
 Nicholas Coombe as Andy Cooper, Ben's son
 Matreya Scarrwener as Dora Cooper, Ben's daughter
 Erica Tremblay as Bunny Cooper, Ben's daughter
 Rachel Dratch as the voice of Mary

Production
The series was first announced in 2015 as Imaginary Friend which was then changed to Imaginary Gary. In the original pilot, the main characters were both men and the love interest was a single mom. When the series went into development, the genders of the characters were flipped. Elfman filmed her scenes first with a puppet in order for the animators to have a reference point, and then in a later take without anything to show what she was talking to. Dratch did her voice work separately in New York with the scenes already filmed. She said at the TCA press tour, "I have the freedom to go crazy."

In September 2016, it was reported that the show's crew would make changes with the animation for the character, Mary, after it received a poor reception from ABC. ABC then reduced the original thirteen-episode order for the first season to nine episodes in order to allow the show's crew to make changes with the animation.

Episodes

Reception

Critical response
The series received a generally negative response from critics. On review aggregator site Metacritic, Imaginary Mary has a metascore of 39 out of 100 based on 13 critics signifying "generally unfavorable reviews". On another review aggregator site Rotten Tomatoes, the show has a 27% approval rating, based on 22 reviews, with an average rating of 3.9/10. The site's critical consensus: "Imaginary Mary appealing cast is canceled out by uninspired material and a ridiculous premise whose deficiencies are compounded by an unfunny, ill-advised CGI creature."

Ratings

See also
 Drop Dead Fred, a 1991 British/American dark fantasy black-comedy film with a similar concept.
 Son of Zorn, another live-action/animated hybrid that premiered in the 2016–2017 season.

References

External links
 
 
 Imaginary Mary at Facebook

American Broadcasting Company original programming
2010s American single-camera sitcoms
2017 American television series debuts
2017 American television series endings
American fantasy television series
American television shows featuring puppetry
American television series with live action and animation
English-language television shows
Television series about dysfunctional families
Television series by ABC Studios
Television series by Happy Madison Productions
Television series by Sony Pictures Television
Television shows set in Chicago
Television shows filmed in British Columbia